The Sheraton Tel Aviv Hotel is a large hotel on Hayarkon Street in Tel Aviv, Israel.

History

First Hotel
The first Sheraton-Tel Aviv Hotel was located 1 mile north of today's hotel, on the north side of Independence Park. The hotel was originally designed in 1948 as the Nordau Plaza Hotel, and construction was 80 percent completed in 1952, when it was halted.  The incomplete shell was acquired by Chicago-based investors in 1957, who planned to complete it, but that project collapsed. It was finally bought by a Milwaukee-based group, which completed the $4,500,000, 220-room, 7-story hotel. It opened in March 1961 as the Sheraton-Tel Aviv Hotel, the first Sheraton hotel outside the US and Canada. The 16th Chess Olympiad was held at the Sheraton-Tel Aviv in 1964. A 136-room wing was added to the hotel in November 1970. The Sheraton was renamed in 1974 and demolished in 1991. The site remains vacant today, but the adjacent beach is still known locally as Sheraton Beach.

Current Hotel
The current hotel was built by Ignatz Bubis and Emilio Bruns, and designed by Werner Joseph Wittkower (who had also designed the 1961 hotel) and Yaakov Rechter. It opened on March 12, 1977 as the Tel Aviv-Sheraton Hotel and was later known as the Sheraton Tel Aviv Hotel & Towers.

The site
A structure known as the Red House previously stood on the site of the current hotel. It was constructed in 1926 and served as the seat of the city council, and later the headquarters of the Haganah and the Mossad LeAliyah Bet, which coordinated the smuggling of illegal Jewish immigrants into British Mandatory Palestine. During the  1948 Arab–Israeli War, the Red House served as the headquarters of David Ben-Gurion and the supreme command of the Israel Defense Forces. After the war, it was briefly the seat of the Ministry of Foreign Affairs. The Red House was demolished to build the hotel. A plaque at the entrance to the hotel commemorates its history.

Gallery

References

External links

 Sheraton Tel Aviv Hotel official website

Hotels established in 1977
Hotel buildings completed in 1977
Hotels in Tel Aviv
Sheraton hotels
1977 establishments in Israel
Yaakov Rechter buildings